Kyaukme may refer to:
 Kyaukme, Shan State, a town in northern Shan State, Myanmar
 Kyaukme District, a district in Shan State
 Kyaukme Township
 Kyaukme Dam